Lengre is a village in Khanapur (Vita) taluka of Sangli district of Maharashtra in India.

Nearby locations
Vita
Bhood
Devikhindi
Madhalmuthi
Waluj

References 

Villages in Sangli district